Belkıs Akkale (born 17 May 1954) is a Turkish folk music singer.

Discography

45rpms 
 Seni Allah Verdi Kimse Alamaz / Aşk Mahkumu (Altunç-1972)
 Boş Beşik / Gözüm Kapıda Kaldı (Ümit-1973)
 İnsan Sevdiğine Kardeş Mi Der / Kızılırmak (Ümit-1974)
 Sevdiğime Pişman Oldum / Gizli Bir Aşk (Mevsim-1974)
 Sahte Sevda / Zorla Güzellik Olmaz (Harman-19xx)
 Füsun / Güzel Sana Güle Güle (Harman-19xx)
 Bir Kadeh Susuz Rakı / Meyhaneler Oldu Benim En Son Durağım (Füsun-19xx)

Albums 
 1977 Kaldır Nikabını (Özaydın)
 1978 Gam Elinden (Kervan)
 1980 Dostlara Selam (Yağmur)
 1982 Dadey (Yağmur)
 1983 Sağolun (Yağmur)
 1984 Türkü Türkü Türkiyem 1 (Sembol)
 1985 Türkü Türkü Türkiyem 2 (Sembol)
 1986 Güvercinim (Midas)
 1988 Nerdesin (Midas)
 1989 Gönül Telinden-1 (Midas)
 1991 91'e Merhaba (Midas)
 1991 Türküler Bizden Dinlemek Sizden with Hülya Süer and Güler Duman (Bonus)
 1992 Ayrılığı Türkülere Sor/Yemen Yolu (Güvercin)
 1992 Kaynana / Vay Bana (Raks)
 1992 Ezgi Şöleni 2 with İzzet Altınmeşe (Ulus Müzik)
 1993 Seher Bülbülü (Dünya)
 1994 Ezgi Şöleni with İzzet Altınmeşe (Ulus Müzik)
 1994 Ben de Yoruldum (Ulus Müzik)
 1994 Geri Gelmiyor / Al Yanaklım (ASM)
 1996 Seher Yıldızı with Arif Sağ (Güvercin)
 1999 Barış Türküsü (Güvercin)
 2000 Özlenenler, Vol. 1 (A1 Müzik)
 2009 Nağmeger / Kaldır Mihrabını (Anadolu)
 2014 Türküler Bizi Anlatır - 1 / Teberik (Buz)

Filmography

References

1954 births
Living people
Turkish folk singers
Turkish women singers